National Highway 330D, commonly referred to as NH 330D is a national highway in India. It is a secondary route of National Highway 30.  NH-330D runs in the state of Uttar Pradesh in India.

Route 
NH330D connects Sitapur, Misrikh, Pratap Nagar, Hardoi, Bilgram and Kannauj in the state of Uttar Pradesh.

Junctions  
 
  Terminal near Sitapur.
  near Hardoi
  Terminal near Kannauj.

See also 
 List of National Highways in India
 List of National Highways in India by state

References

External links 

 NH 330D on OpenStreetMap

National highways in India
National Highways in Uttar Pradesh